The Tour de Georgia was a U.S. professional road cycling stage race across the state of Georgia. The race began in 2003 and was contested six times until 2008. It was one of the three events in North America ranked as Hors Classe (2.HC) stage race events by the UCI, which is cycling's international governing body, along with the Tour of Missouri and the Tour of California. The event was cancelled in 2009 and 2010, and despite its backers aiming for the race to be held again in 2011, it has not been held since.

History
Conceived by then-commissioner R. K. Sehgal in 2002, the race was developed by the Georgia Department of Industry, Trade and Tourism (now known as the Georgia Department of Economic Development) for the benefit of the Georgia Cancer Coalition.  Beginning with the 2008 race, The Aflac Cancer Center and Blood Disorders Service of Children's Healthcare of Atlanta will be the race's official beneficiary organization. The Tour de Georgia has boosted tourism in Georgia providing 2.3 million visitors and a $26 million economic impact between 2003 and 2006.

The race quickly generated international attention when the U.S. Postal Service cycling team began using it as part of Lance Armstrong's preparation for the Tour de France. Armstrong rode in the race before his Tour campaigns in 2004 and 2005, and Floyd Landis won it before his Tour victory (later disallowed, along with all of Armstrongs wins at a later date) in 2006.

On 14 November 2008, the directors of the Tour de Georgia announced that the 2009 race would be canceled, but that the race planned to return in 2010.  The reason given was a lack of sponsorship, which had caused the Tour to seek some reductions in 2008 bills. The 2010 event was also cancelled for financial reasons, although the race's backers were aiming for the race to return in 2011. As of July 2012, the race has not been revived.

Route
This six stage event extends riders over 600 miles in six days. One ends in a steep ascent to the top of Brasstown Bald, the highest point in Georgia. As in the Tour de France, the overall leader wears a yellow jersey.

History of results

General Classification 
The current leader and overall winner by time after each stage and at the conclusion of the race is awarded the Yellow Jersey.

Sprints Classification 
The Sprint Leader Jersey is a gray and Aqua-blue Jersey is worn by the rider that receives the most bonus points awarded through his placing in intermediate sprints and finishing in the top 15 places at the end of the stage.

Mountains Classification 
The King of the Mountains Jersey is worn by current leader and overall winner by points awarded by his placing in mountain climbs. The leader wears a Georgia-inspired Peaches Theme Jersey (in substitution of the traditional polka dot theme of the Tour de France jersey).

Best Young Rider Classification 
The Best Young Rider is the best racer in General Classification that has less than 25 years old. He wears a Green Jersey.

Most Aggressive Rider Classification 
The Most Aggressive Rider wears the Blue and Green Jersey. The jersey is awarded at the end of each stage to the rider that demonstrates the most aggressive attacks, breakaways or strategies, as judged by a panel of media and race entourage officials (since 2005).

References

External links
Tour de Georgia blog
Tour de Georgia photos and stories
Tour de Georgia statistics and results 

 
UCI America Tour races
Cycle races in the United States
Recurring sporting events established in 2003
Cycling in Georgia (U.S. state)
2003 establishments in Georgia (U.S. state)